Miss Universe Thailand 2017 was the 18th edition of the Miss Universe Thailand pageant held at Royal Paragon Hall, Siam Paragon in Bangkok on 29 July 2017. Chalita Suansane from Samut Prakan crowned her successor at the end of the event.

The coronation pageant was broadcast live on Channel 3 Thailand. The crowned winner was Maria Ehren of Bangkok, who later represented Thailand at the Miss Universe 2017 competition in the Las Vegas, United States and finished in the Top 5. One of the 2nd Runner-Up, Paweensuda Drouin represented Thailand at the Miss Earth 2017 and entered Top 8. Paweensuda is the last Thailand's representative at Miss Earth who was chosen by Miss Universe Thailand and she also became the first 2nd Runner-up of pageant competed in Miss Earth instead of 1st Runner-up as previous years.

Results
Color keys

§: Ratapiraya directly entered into Top 16 after winning Miss People's Choice.

Special awards

Delegates
40 delegates have been confirmed. The information from Miss Universe Thailand Official website

References

External links
 Miss Universe Thailand Official website

2017
2017 in Bangkok
2017 beauty pageants
Beauty pageants in Thailand
July 2017 events in Thailand